Brindister is a settlement on the West Mainland of Shetland, Scotland. It is within the parish of Sandsting, and on the western shore of Brindister Voe. The remains of the Broch of Brindister Voe are to the south-east of the settlement.

Brindister provides the only road access to the sea on either side of the sinuous voe, which contains a long-line common mussel fishery.

References

External links

Canmore - Brindister, Norse Mill site record
Vision of Britain - Brindister Shetland

Villages in Mainland, Shetland